Germain, is the French variant of the name Germanus.

Notable people with the name include:

Surname
Adrienne Germain (1947–2022), American women's health advocate
 André Germain (1903–1988), French cinematographer
Bruno Germain, French association football player 
Columbus Germain, American politician
François-Thomas Germain, (1726–1791) French silversmith
George Germain, 1st Viscount Sackville, British Secretary of State during the American Revolutionary War
Ivor Germain (1923–1982), a Barbadian boxer of the 1940s and 1950s
Louis Germain, (1878–1942) French malacologist
Paul Germain, American animation producer
Sophie Germain, French mathematician
Tabitha St. Germain, Canadian stage and voice actress
Valère Germain, French association football player, son of Bruno

Given name
Germain de Brie (c. 1490–1538), French poet, writing in Latin
Germain Ifedi (born 1994), American football player
Germain Kambinga, Congolese politician

Pseudonym

"Mr. KABC", Marc Germain, a radio talk show host in Los Angeles, California
Ernest Mandel, pseudonym for a Trotskyist politician

French masculine given names